The 2011 BVA Open was a professional tennis tournament played on clay courts. It was the first edition of the tournament which is part of the 2011 ATP Challenger Tour. It took place in São José do Rio Preto, Brazil between 24 and 30 October 2011.

ATP entrants

Seeds

 1 Rankings are as of October 17, 2011.

Other entrants
The following players received wildcards into the singles main draw:
  Thiago Alves
  Augusto Laranja
  Carlos Oliveira
  Bruno Semenzato

The following players received entry as a special exempt into the singles main draw:
  Andre Begemann

The following players received entry from the qualifying draw:
  Martín Alund
  James Duckworth
  Pablo Galdón
  José Pereira

Champions

Singles

 Ricardo Mello def.  Eduardo Schwank, 6–4, 6–2

Doubles

 Frederico Gil /  Jaroslav Pospíšil def.  Franco Ferreiro /  Rubén Ramírez Hidalgo, 6–4, 6–4

External links
Official Website
ITF Search
ATP official site

2011 ATP Challenger Tour
Clay court tennis tournaments
Tennis tournaments in Brazil